Ståle Kyllingstad (7 November 1903 – 26 November 1987) was a Norwegian sculptor and designer. He was born in Kvinesdal; the son of farmers Retsius Kyllingstad and Tale Katrine Røinestad. He was married to writer Camilla Carlson. Kyllingstad is known for his war memorials, and for his designs for Hadeland Glassverk. He is represented in the National Gallery of Norway with the statuette Okse from 1956, and a head sculpture of Finn Carling.

References

1903 births
1987 deaths
People from Kvinesdal
Norwegian sculptors
Glass artists
20th-century sculptors